The Mexican professional wrestling promotion Consejo Mundial de Lucha Libre (CMLL; Spanish for "World Wrestling Council") has held a variety of different professional wrestling tournaments since it was founded in 1933. CMLL holds several annually recurring tournaments as well as tournaments to either determine who should hold a championship or who should challenge for a championship. CMLL has also held some uniquely lucha libre tournaments, such as a "Losers Advance" Ruleta de la Muerte ("Roulette of death") tournament when the loser of the final match would be forced to either unmask or have his or her hair shaved off. As professional wrestling tournaments, they are not won and lost legitimately; they are instead won via a predefined outcome of matches.

Tournament chronology

1933-1989

1990-1999

2000-2009

2010-present

Recurring tournaments
En Busca de un Ídolo
La Copa Junior
Gran Alternativa
International Gran Prix
Leyenda de Azul
Leyenda de Plata
Torneo Nacional de Parejas Increíbles
Pequeños Reyes del Aire
Reyes del Aire
Universal Championship

References

Consejo Mundial de Lucha Libre tournaments